Italo Falcomatà (1943 – 2001) was an Italian politician and school and university teacher. Three times mayor of Reggio Calabria, from 1993 to 2001, under his guidance a period known as the Reggio Spring began. From 1970 to 1971, the city of Reggio was the scene of a popular uprising – known as the Moti di Reggio – against the government choice of Catanzaro as capital of the newly instituted Region of Calabria; afterwards there was a period of social and urban deterioration which lasted until the Reggio Spring began. His youngest child Giuseppe Falcomatà is the current mayor of Reggio since 2014.

Bibliography
 Vv. Aa. ...E a Reggio sbocciò la primavera. Italo Falcomatà, il primo dei cittadini, Città del Sole Edizioni, 2012, 
 Oscar Gaspari, Rosario Forlenza, Sante Cruciani, Storie di sindaci per la storia d'Italia, Donzelli Editore, 2009

References

Mayors of Reggio Calabria
People from Reggio Calabria
1943 births
2001 deaths
Deaths from cancer in Calabria
Deaths from leukemia